South Fork is a statutory town in Rio Grande County, Colorado, United States. It lies at the confluence of the South Fork and Rio Grande rivers. The population was 386 at the 2010 census.

Geography

History
South Fork was once the site of timber milling operations.

South Fork was founded in 1882, by which date its location was already marked by the presence of a coaching post, dating from the construction of the railroad connection of the Rio Grande Western Railroad line to Creede, which had been built to support the Creede silver mine.   It was only in 1992 that South Fork achieved independent statutory town status, making it the youngest statutory town in the state.   Originally the principal economic activities involved forestry and mining, but in recent decades these have been overtaken in the employment statistics by tourism.

South Fork made Colorado headlines during the Summer of 2020 when its town board announced that solicitations for donations was unlawful within town limits.  This was in response to a local farmer's market in which one of its vendors was asking people for donations to the Black Lives Matter movement and the NAACP.

Demographics

South Fork has about 600 permanent residents, but a substantially larger summer population due to seasonal residents and visitors.

As of the census of 2000, there were 604 people, 274 households, and 187 families residing in the town. The racial makeup of the town was 92.88% White, 0.17% African American, 0.33% Native American, 0.17% Asian, 2.98% from other races, and 3.48% from two or more races. Hispanic or Latino of any race were 12.42% of the population.

There were 274 households, out of which 25.5% had children under the age of 18 living with them, 58.0% were married couples living together, 8.8% had a female householder with no husband present, and 31.4% were non-families. 27.7% of all households were made up of individuals, and 7.3% had someone living alone who was 65 years of age or older.  The average household size was 2.20 and the average family size was 2.63.

In the town, the population was spread out, with 21.7% under the age of 18, 7.1% from 18 to 24, 24.5% from 25 to 44, 29.1% from 45 to 64, and 17.5% who were 65 years of age or older.  The median age was 43 years. For every 100 females, there were 96.1 males.  For every 100 females age 18 and over, there were 99.6 males.

The median income for a household in the town was $36,667, and the median income for a family was $45,417. Males had a median income of $32,188 versus $19,063 for females. The per capita income for the town was $26,128.  About 4.1% of families and 6.1% of the population were below the poverty line, including 6.7% of those under age 18 and 1.6% of those age 65 or over.

Cultural references
In the 1983 movie National Lampoon's Vacation starring Chevy Chase as Clark Griswold, the Griswold family spend the night at a camping ground in South Fork.

See also

Outline of Colorado
Index of Colorado-related articles
State of Colorado
Colorado cities and towns
Colorado municipalities
Colorado counties
Rio Grande County, Colorado
San Juan Mountains

References

External links
 Town of South Fork website (archive link)
 CDOT map of the Town of South Fork

Towns in Rio Grande County, Colorado
Towns in Colorado
Colorado populated places on the Rio Grande